Gaston Diamé (born 16 November 1971) is a Mauritanian former international footballer who played as a striker.

Career
Born in Dakar, Senegal, Diamé spent his entire club career in France, playing for Saint-Christophe Châteauroux, SO Romorantin, US Joué-lès-Tours, FC Bourges, Reims, Angoulême CFC, AS Yzeure and SNID.

He also earned two international caps for Mauritania in 2003, both of which came in FIFA World Cup qualifying games.

References

1971 births
Living people
Footballers from Dakar
Mauritanian footballers
Mauritania international footballers
Mauritanian football managers
Bourges 18 players
SO Romorantin players
Stade de Reims players
Angoulême Charente FC players
Moulins Yzeure Foot players
Paris FC managers
US Joué-lès-Tours players
Association football forwards